Maria Giuseppina Cucciari (born  18 August 1973), best known as Geppi Cucciari, is an Italian stand-up comedian, actress, radio host and television presenter.

Life and career 
Born in Cagliari, Cucciari spent her youth in Macomer,  in the province of Nuoro. She studied law at the University of Cagliari, and eventually moved to Milan where she graduated at the Università Cattolica del Sacro Cuore. In 2000 she joined the theater workshop "Scaldasole" and later entered the artistic laboratory Zelig.

After working on stage and in several radio programs, Cucciari had her breakout in 2003 with the variety show Zelig Off. Between 2005 and 2009, she was a regular in the sitcom Belli dentro, and in 2006 she debuted as a writer with the humour fiction novel Meglio donna che male accompagnata. As a presenter, she hosted two editions of the Canale 5 show Italia's Got Talent.

Filmography

References

External links

 

1973 births
Living people
People from Cagliari
Italian film actresses
Italian stage actresses
Italian television actresses
Italian women comedians
21st-century Italian actresses
21st-century Italian comedians
Università Cattolica del Sacro Cuore alumni
University of Cagliari alumni
Italian women television presenters